Eupodiscaceae  is a diatom family (Bacillariophyceae) present both in marine and freshwater habitats Odontella is the only genera in this family with typical marine species. However, Round et al. (1990) placed Odontella in Triceratiaceae (Schutt) Lemmermann, order Triceratiales Round and Crawford, subclass Biddulphiophycidae Round and Crawford. The taxonomic status of this family is unclear and disputed.

See also
 Odontella C.A. Agardh

References

Further reading

Diatom families
Coscinodiscophyceae